"Somebody's Doin' Me Right" is a song written by J. Fred Knobloch, Paul Overstreet and Dan Tyler, and recorded by American country music artist Keith Whitley. It was posthumously released in January 1992 as the second single from his album, Kentucky Bluebird, and reached No. 15 on the Billboard Hot Country Singles & Tracks chart.

Other versions
It was previously released by Glen Campbell on his 1991 album Unconditional Love. Before that, S-K-O recorded it on their debut album Schuyler, Knobloch and Overstreet.

Personnel
 Eddie Bayers — drums
 Paul Franklin — steel guitar
 Brent Mason — electric guitar
 Dave Pomeroy — bass guitar
 Billy Sanford — acoustic guitar
 Dennis Wilson — background vocals
 Curtis Young — background vocals

Chart performance

References

1992 singles
S-K-O songs
Glen Campbell songs
Keith Whitley songs
Songs written by J. Fred Knobloch
Songs written by Paul Overstreet
Songs written by Dan Tyler
Song recordings produced by Garth Fundis
RCA Records singles
Songs released posthumously
1986 songs